The Ven Robert Aidan (Bob) Fitzharris (b August 1946) was the Archdeacon of Doncaster from 2001 to 2011.
 
Fitzharris was educated at  St Anselm's College and  the University of Sheffield. He was a dentist from 1971 to 1987. He studied for the priesthood at Lichfield Theological College; and was ordained in 1990. After a curacy at Dinnington he was Vicar of Bentley from 1992 to 2001.

References

1946 births
People educated at St. Anselm's College
Alumni of the University of Sheffield
Archdeacons of Doncaster
Alumni of Lichfield Theological College
Living people
English dentists